"So Emotional" is a song by Whitney Houston.

So Emotional may also refer to:

 "So Emotional", a song by Alex Parks from Honesty
 "So Emotional", a song by Christina Aguilera from her self-titled debut album
 "So Emotional", a song by Kashif from Music from My Mind
 "So Emotional", a song by K-Ci & JoJo from Emotional
 "So Emotional", a song by Ray Dalton